The 1908 United States presidential election in Arkansas took place on November 3, 1908. All contemporary 46 states were part of the 1908 United States presidential election. Voters chose nine electors to the Electoral College, which selected the president and vice president.

Since 1890, Arkansas had been a classic Jim Crow Southern state in which most blacks and poor whites had been disfranchised by poll taxes. This would confine significant Republican Party politics to the two Unionist Ozark counties of Newton and Searcy that remained controlled by the GOP at a local level throughout the “Solid South” era. Because the coinage of silver had been the dominant political issue apart from black disfranchisement ever since the poll tax was passed, the state would powerfully back “free silver” Democrat William Jennings Bryan in 1896. However, in the following elections disfranchisement affected poor whites more than blacks, with the result that the Republican Party became somewhat more competitive despite being still associated with Reconstruction. The GOP was helped in the earlier 1900s elections by the view that 1904 Democratic nominee Alton B. Parker had betrayed Bryan with his support for the gold standard.

By October polls made it clear that Arkansas would stay firmly with the “Solid South”, and this is what was observed: indeed Bryan improved on Parker's 1904 margin by almost five percentage points despite dislike of Bryan's retreat from free silver.

Results

Results by county

See also
 United States presidential elections in Arkansas

References

 

Arkansas
1908
1908 Arkansas elections